Somebody to Love may refer to:

Music 
 "Somebody to Love" (Jefferson Airplane song), 1967
 "Somebody to Love" (Justin Bieber song), 2010
 "Somebody to Love" (Suzy Bogguss song), 1998
 "Somebody to Love" (Leighton Meester song), 2009
 "Somebody to Love" (Queen song), 1976
 "Somebody to Love" (OneRepublic song), 2019
 "Somebody to Love", by Big Bang from the album Tonight, 2011
 "Somebody to Love", by Bobby Darin from the album For Teenagers Only, 1960
 "Somebody to Love", by Nelly Furtado from the album Loose, 2006
 "Somebody to Love", a song from the rock musical film Hair
 "Somebody to Love", by Chris Isaak from the album Always Got Tonight, 2006
 "Somebody to Love", by TVXQ from the album Heart, Mind and Soul, 2006
 "Solo Quiero (Somebody to Love)", a song by Leona Lewis, Cali y El Dandee and Juan Magán, 2019

Television and film 
 Somebody to Love (1994 film), a 1994 American film starring Rosie Perez
 Somebody to Love (2014 film), a Filipino film
 "Somebody to Love" (30 Rock), an episode of 30 Rock
 "Somebody to Love" (That '70s Show), an episode of That '70s Show

See also 
 Somebody to Love Me (disambiguation)
 "Everybody Needs Somebody to Love", a 1964 song by Solomon Burke
 Someone to Love (disambiguation)
 To Love Somebody (disambiguation)
 "Nobody to Love", a 2014 song by Sigma